Ferdinand Budicki Automobile Museum is an automobile museum in Zagreb, Croatia, the first one in the country. It is located on Zaprešićka 2, Jablanovec as a part of the Westgate shopping center.

The museum was founded by car enthusiast Valentino Valjak, and named after Ferdinand Budicki, owner of the first car to drive through Zagreb streets, in April 1901. Among the museum's exhibits are a 1916 truck from Prague, the oldest in Croatia, an expensive Jaguar E-Type, a 1922 Ford Model T, a rare 1967 Rolls-Royce Silver Shadow worth more than €100,000, a Citroën 2CV, known locally as "spaček" and a Zastava 750 ("fićo"), as well as a blue ZET tram. It also showcases the history of automobilism in Croatia through photographs and several hours of documentary film.

The museum took part in the 2015 Museum Night, bringing in 14,500 visitors. On 17 April 2015, it started to organise a weekly car exhibition on Britain Square in the city centre. Its first non-permanent exhibition lasted from September 1 to November 1 and featured six Citroën 2CV cars in honour of the 65th anniversary of 2CV.

In 2018, the museum moved from the former Pluto factory in Zavrtnica neighborhood to Westgate Shopping City, a large shopping mall north-west of Zagreb.

The museum entrance fee is 30 kuna (around €4) for adults and 20 kuna (around €2.60) for children. It is open seven days a week.

References

External links
 

Museums in Croatia
Automotive museums
Budicki
2013 establishments in Croatia
Museums established in 2013
Budicki